Edward Tavernor was an English politician who sat in the House of Commons between 1626 and 1629.

Tavernor may have been  the son of John Tavernor, surveyor of the King's Woods in 1605. In 1626, he was elected Member of Parliament for Woodstock. He was re-elected MP for Woodstock in 1628 and sat until 1629 when King Charles dispensed with parliament for eleven years. His name appears in the Calendar of State Papers receiving reimbursement for royal expenses at this time. He was Secretary to the Lord Chamberlain, Philip Herbert, Earl of Pembroke and Montgomery, in December 1630, and was still held the post in 1637.

References

Year of birth missing
Year of death missing
English MPs 1626
English MPs 1628–1629